Ahli United Bank of Kuwait (AUBK) is a traditional bank founded in 1971, providing retail, private and corporate banking services with headquarters in Safat, Kuwait City.

Timeline:
 1941 - founded as the Imperial Bank of Persia, the first bank in Kuwait and affiliated to the British bank with a concession from the ruler Ahmad Al-Jaber Al-Sabah
 1971 - concession ended, the bank was 100% Kuwaiti and name was changed to the Bank of Kuwait and Middle East (BKME)
 2002 - AUB Group became a major shareholder
 2010 - conversion to Islamic banking.

In 2016 AUBK was selected as the second safest Islamic bank in Kuwait.

See also 
List of banks in Kuwait
List of banks in Asia

References

External links 
Homepage

Banks of Kuwait
Banks established in 1971
Companies based in Kuwait City
Kuwaiti companies established in 1971
Companies listed on the Boursa Kuwait